Velia Eguiluz (born 1 April 1965) is a Mexican beach volleyball player. She competed in the women's tournament at the 1996 Summer Olympics.

References

1965 births
Living people
Mexican women's beach volleyball players
Olympic beach volleyball players of Mexico
Beach volleyball players at the 1996 Summer Olympics
Place of birth missing (living people)